The bovid subfamily Reduncinae or tribe Reduncini is composed of nine species of antelope, all of which dwell in marshes, floodplains, or other well-watered areas, including the waterbucks and reedbucks. These antelopes first appear in the fossil record 7.4 million years ago in Eurasia and 6.6 Mya in Africa.

Taxonomy
 Family Bovidae
 Subfamily Reduncinae
 Genus Kobus
 Waterbuck, Kobus ellipsiprymnus
 Kob, Kobus kob
 Lechwe, Kobus leche
 Nile lechwe, Kobus megaceros
 Puku, Kobus vardonii
 Genus Redunca
 Southern reedbuck, Redunca arundinum
 Mountain reedbuck, Redunca fulvorufula
 Bohor reedbuck, Redunca redunca 
 Genus Pelea
 Grey rhebok, Pelea capreolus
 Genus †Menelikia
Menelikia leakeyi
Menelikia lyrocera
 Genus †Procobus
Procobus brauneri
Procobus melania
 Genus †Sivacobus (Late Pliocene to Late Pleistocene of the Indian subcontinent)
Sivacobus palaeindicus
Sivacobus patulicornis
Sivacobus sankaliai (Late Pleistocene)
 Genus †Thaleroceros
Thaleroceros radiciformis
 Genus †Zephyreduncinus
Zephyreduncinus oundagaisus

Alternate classification
 Adenota is an alternate genus or subgenus composed of the kob and puku.

References

 
Bovidae
Mammal tribes